María del Carmen Concepción González (born 15 September 1957) is a Cuban politician and the Cuban Minister of Food Industries (2009–present). She was appointed as a result of the 2009 shake-up by Raúl Castro. She is a Deputy to the National Assembly of Popular Power. She was First Secretary of the Communist Party of Cuba in the Pinar del Río Province.

References
 The Miami Herald, "Cuban Economy: Purge Aims to Halt Cuba's Economic Free Fall", Sunday March 8, 2009, Page 1A.

External links
 https://web.archive.org/web/20090306080555/http://www.granma.cubaweb.cu/pdf/martes/pagina5.pdf
 https://web.archive.org/web/20071011123545/http://wtopnews.com/?nid=105

 
  
 

Living people
Government ministers of Cuba
Communist Party of Cuba politicians
Women government ministers of Cuba
1957 births
21st-century Cuban women politicians
21st-century Cuban politicians